Finkley Down is a suburb and hamlet in the civil parish of Finkley in Hampshire, England. It is in the civil parish of Smannell.  Its nearest town is Andover, which lies approximately 2.4 miles (4.5 km) south-west from the suburb. The suburb is made up of a few industrial estates and a farm.

Villages in Hampshire
Test Valley